The Netherlands competed at the 2022 World Aquatics Championships in Budapest, Hungary from 18 June to 3 July.

Medalists

Artistic swimming

The Netherlands entered 2 artistic swimmers (2 female).

Diving 

Women

Open water swimming 

Men

Women

Swimming 

 Men

 Women

 Mixed

Water polo 

Summary

Women's tournament

Team roster

Group A

Play-offs

Quarterfinals

Semifinals

Third place game

References 

Nations at the 2022 World Aquatics Championships
2022
2022 in Dutch sport